Vulpecula OB1 is an OB association in which a batch of massive stars are being born. It was first identified by W. W. Morgan et al. (1953). The association is located in the Orion Arm about 7,500 light-years away from the Sun. Nebulae that are contained in this association include NGC 6820 and NGC 6823, plus Sharpless 2-88.

References

Stellar associations
Vulpecula
Star-forming regions